Shuangjiang Subdistrict is a subdistrict and the county seat of Eshan Yi Autonomous County, Yunnan, southwestern China. The name Shuangjiang means "two rivers" in Chinese language because it is located near where Lian River joins the Ni River.

Township-level divisions of Yuxi